The Music for Cars Tour was a concert tour by British pop rock band The 1975 in support of their third studio album A Brief Inquiry Into Online Relationships, released on 30 November 2018. The 24-month long world tour began on 29 November 2018 in the United Kingdom. The tour was also scheduled to support their fourth studio album–and second part of the Music For Cars era–Notes on a Conditional Form, released on 22 May 2020. However, the tour prematurely ended on 3 March 2020 in the wake of the worldwide COVID-19 pandemic. Originally, the tour was scheduled to conclude on 10 July 2021 in London, England. The tour was supported with the following opening acts and special guests: No Rome, Pale Waves, The Japanese House and Beabadoobee.

Several of the 2020 sets were postponed to 2021, but on 12 January 2021, the band cancelled all 2021 shows due to little improvement with the pandemic.

Set list 
This set list is representative of the show on 15 February 2020 in Nottingham, England. It does not represent all dates throughout the tour.

 "People"
 "Sex"
 "TOOTIMETOOTIMETOOTIME"
 "Me & You Together Song"
 "Sincerity Is Scary"
 "It's Not Living (If It's Not with You)"
 "If You're Too Shy (Let Me Know)"
 "Love Me"
 "I Couldn't Be More in Love"
 "Guys"
 "Robbers"
 "Fallingforyou"
 "Milk"
 "Lostmyhead"
 "Frail State of Mind"
 "I Like America & America Likes Me"
 "Somebody Else"
 "I Always Wanna Die (Sometimes)"
 "Love It If We Made It"
 "Paris"
 "Chocolate"
 "Give Yourself a Try"
 "The Sound"

Tour dates

Cancelled shows

Box office score data

Notes

References 

2018 concert tours
2019 concert tours
2020 concert tours
The 1975
Concert tours cancelled due to the COVID-19 pandemic